The Saint David Awards (Welsh: Gwobrau Dewi Sant) are an annual government awards scheme which recognizes exceptional achievements by Welsh citizens within Wales, the UK and globally. They are the highest accolades that the Welsh Government confers on its civilians.

Previous winners include Cerys Matthews, Michael Sheen, Tanni Grey-Thompson, and Bryn Terfel.

Aims and categories

The Awards aim to "reflect and promote the aspirations of Wales and its citizens to be a modern, vibrant country, with a growing reputation as a confident and clever nation valuing innovation, community spirit, and above all its people".

Currently, there are nine award categories:
 Bravery
 Citizenship
 Culture
 Enterprise 
 Innovation & Technology 
 International
 Sport
 Young Person Award
 First Ministers Special Award

Selection process

The Welsh public are invited to nominate candidates, from which a shortlist of three finalists in each category is selected by a specially commissioned advisory committee. The award winners are decided by the First Minister.

See also

 Welsh Government
List of Wales-related topics
 The UK Honours System

References

Welsh awards